Observation is sensing and assimilating the knowledge of a phenomenon into a framework of previous knowledge and ideas.

Observation may also refer to:

Observation in auditing, a procedure to obtain audit evidence.
Observation tower
Observation deck
Observer (special relativity) a specialized meaning of the concept that physicists use
Observation car (often abbreviated to observation), a type of railroad passenger car
Watchful waiting (also referred to as observation), an approach to a medical problem in which time is allowed to pass before further testing or therapy is pursued
Medical observation
Observations and Measurements, an information model and data transfer standard
An empirically obtained random variate in statistics
A realization of a random variable (a unit of a sample), in statistics

As a proper name
"The Observation", a song by Donovan from his 1967 album Mellow Yellow
"Observations", a song by Avail from their 1992 album Satiate
 Observations (album), a 1996 album by Steve Swell and Chris Kelsey
Observations (book), Richard Avedon's 1959 collaborative book with Truman Capote containing portraits of famous people
Observation (video game), a 2019 video game developed by No Code and published by Devolver Digital
Observation (steamboat), a vessel that exploded and sank in New York City in 1932 
Observations (Pierre Belon), a 16th-century ethnographical book

See also
Observer (disambiguation)
Observation balloon
Observation post
Surveillance